The 1999–2000 NHL season was the 83rd regular season of the National Hockey League. With the addition of the expansion Atlanta Thrashers, 28 teams each played 82 games. This was the first season played in which teams were awarded a point for an overtime loss. The New Jersey Devils defeated the defending champion Dallas Stars for their second Stanley Cup championship. During the regular season, no player reached the 100-point plateau, the first time in a non-lockout season since the 1967–68 season. Also, in the 2000 Stanley Cup playoffs, the New Jersey Devils overcame a three-games-to-one deficit against the Philadelphia Flyers to win the Eastern Conference Finals.

League business
Throughout the regular season and playoffs, teams wore a patch celebrating the turn of the millennium (see above). 

Beginning this season, teams would earn one point for an overtime loss in the regular season instead of zero. It was hoped that this change would stop teams from playing very defensively during the overtime to guarantee the single point from a tie. The number of ties had been going up for some years and the NHL was hoping to counter this trend and did so quite successfully with this rule change.

This season was also the start of the NHL's partnership with ABC, who would televise a few regional games every season, as well as games three through seven of the Stanley Cup Finals. ESPN, who with the ABC deal renewed their contract with the NHL, continued to show regular season and playoff games as well as the first two games of the Stanley Cup Finals.

Wayne Gretzky's jersey number, 99, was retired league-wide on February 6, 2000, at the season's All–Star Game.

The 1999–2000 season was the inaugural year for the Atlanta Thrashers. They would join the Southeast Division, marking the return of the NHL to Atlanta since the Atlanta Flames moved to Calgary in 1980. It was also the first year for the Carolina Hurricanes' home rink, the Raleigh Entertainment and Sports Arena, the Los Angeles Kings played their first season at Staples Center after 32 seasons at the Great Western Forum, and the Colorado Avalanche played their first season at Pepsi Center.

A new award, the Roger Crozier Saving Grace Award, was introduced this season for the goaltender with the best save percentage.

Overtime rule changes
The standings will record three points for games decided in overtime: 2 to the winning team, and 1 to the loser. In addition, overtimes will be played with four skaters per side, instead of five.

Uniform changes and patches
League wide: an NHL 2000 patch was worn this season for the new millennium. 

Anaheim: Jade Alternates Retired. Eggplant pants with Jade Stripes are restored.

Atlanta: White jerseys have the team logo, while the road darks have the alternate mark. The team wore inaugural season patches for their first season. 

Carolina: Shade of red is darkened. In addition to the NHL 2000 Patch, the Hurricanes wore two other patches this season, one celebrated the opening of the Raleigh Entertainment and Sports Arena, and the other was in Memory of Steve Chiasson, who died in a single-vehicle, alcohol-involved crash after the Hurricanes were eliminated in the 1999 Stanley Cup Playoffs. 

Chicago: The tan outline on the crest is removed. 

Colorado: Shade of Burgundy is darkened from 1998–1999

Dallas: The alternates from 1998–1999 become the basis of the team's new home Uniform. the actual 1998–1999 Alternates become the new road uniform.

Los Angeles: New Purple alternates introduced. 

New York Rangers: Navy Blue Lady Liberty Alternates return. 

Ottawa: The Alternates from the 1998–1999 become the new Road Uniforms

Phoenix: Crest on the alternates get a sand-colored outline.

Tampa Bay: the alternate jerseys are dropped.

Toronto: All-star game patch worn for 2000 NHL All-Star Game. The Alternates worn during the 1998–1999 season for the last year at Maple Leaf Gardens go on a one year hiatus.

Regular season

Final standings

Eastern Conference

Western Conference

Playoffs

Bracket

Awards

All-Star teams

Player statistics

Scoring leaders
Note: GP = Games played; G = Goals; A = Assists; Pts = Points

Leading goaltenders

Note: GP = Games played; Min = Minutes played; GA = Goals against; GAA = Goals against average; W = Wins; L = Losses; T = Ties; SO = Shutouts

Source: 2001 NHL Yearbook

Coaches

Eastern Conference
Atlanta Thrashers: Curt Fraser
Boston Bruins: Pat Burns
Buffalo Sabres: Lindy Ruff
Carolina Hurricanes: Paul Maurice
Florida Panthers: Terry Murray
Montreal Canadiens: Alain Vigneault
New Jersey Devils: Robbie Ftorek and Larry Robinson
New York Islanders: Butch Goring
New York Rangers: John Muckler and John Tortorella
Ottawa Senators: Jacques Martin
Philadelphia Flyers: Roger Neilson and Craig Ramsay
Pittsburgh Penguins: Herb Brooks
Tampa Bay Lightning: Steve Ludzik
Toronto Maple Leafs: Pat Quinn
Washington Capitals: Ron Wilson

Western Conference
Mighty Ducks of Anaheim: Craig Hartsburg
Calgary Flames: Brian Sutter
Chicago Blackhawks: Lorne Molleken and Bob Pulford
Colorado Avalanche: Bob Hartley
Dallas Stars: Ken Hitchcock
Detroit Red Wings: Scotty Bowman
Edmonton Oilers: Kevin Lowe
Los Angeles Kings: Larry Robinson
Nashville Predators: Barry Trotz
Phoenix Coyotes: Bobby Francis
San Jose Sharks: Darryl Sutter
St. Louis Blues: Joel Quenneville
Vancouver Canucks: Marc Crawford

Milestones

Debuts

The following is a list of players of note who played their first NHL game in 1999–2000 (listed with their first team, an asterisk(*) marks debut in playoffs):
Patrik Stefan, Atlanta Thrashers
Robyn Regehr, Calgary Flames
Alex Tanguay, Colorado Avalanche
Martin Skoula, Colorado Avalanche
Brenden Morrow, Dallas Stars
Brian Rafalski, New Jersey Devils
Scott Gomez, New Jersey Devils
Roberto Luongo, New York Islanders
Brian Boucher, Philadelphia Flyers
Simon Gagne, Philadelphia Flyers
Evgeni Nabokov, San Jose Sharks

Last games
The following is a list of players of note that played their last game in the NHL in 1999–2000 (listed with their last team):
Marty McSorley, Boston Bruins
Grant Fuhr, Calgary Flames
Steve Smith, Calgary Flames
Ed Olczyk, Chicago Blackhawks
Brian Skrudland, Dallas Stars
Guy Carbonneau, Dallas Stars
Ken Wregget, Detroit Red Wings
Bill Ranford, Edmonton Oilers
Ray Sheppard, Florida Panthers
Darren Turcotte, Nashville Predators
Ulf Samuelsson, Philadelphia Flyers
Zarley Zalapski, Philadelphia Flyers
Rob Brown, Pittsburgh Penguins
Pat Falloon, Pittsburgh Penguins
Bob Rouse, San Jose Sharks
Murray Craven, San Jose Sharks
Dave Ellett, St. Louis Blues
Geoff Courtnall, St. Louis Blues
Derek King, St. Louis Blues
Daren Puppa, Tampa Bay Lightning
Shawn Burr, Tampa Bay Lightning
Wendel Clark, Toronto Maple Leafs
Doug Bodger, Vancouver Canucks

Trading deadline
Trading deadline: March 14, 2000.
March 14, 2000: Anaheim traded D Dan Trebil to Pittsburgh for a fifth-round pick in the 2000 Entry Draft.
March 14, 2000: Atlanta traded RW Ed Ward to Anaheim for a conditional pick in the 2001 Entry Draft.
March 14, 2000: Atlanta traded RW Kirby Law to Philadelphia for Vancouver's sixth-round pick in the 2000 Entry Draft (previously acquired) and a conditional pick in 2001.
March 14, 2000: Calgary traded D Cale Hulse and a third-round pick in the 2001 Entry Draft to Nashville for RW Sergei Krivokrasov.
March 14, 2000: Calgary traded G Tyler Moss and LW Rene Corbet to Pittsburgh for D Brad Werenka.
March 14, 2000: Carolina Hurricanes traded C Kent Manderville to Philadelphia Flyers for RW Sandy McCarthy.
March 14, 2000: Edmonton traded LW Josef Beranek to Pittsburgh for LW German Titov.
March 14, 2000: Florida traded C Ryan Johnson and LW Dwayne Hay to Tampa Bay for C Mike Sillinger.
March 14, 2000: Nashville traded G Corey Hirsch to Anaheim for future considerations.
March 14, 2000: New Jersey Devils traded C Brendan Morrison and C Denis Pederson to Vancouver Canucks for RW Alexander Mogilny.
March 14, 2000: Ottawa Senators traded G Ron Tugnutt and D Janne Laukkanen to Pittsburgh Penguins for G Tom Barrasso.
March 14, 2000: NY Islanders traded C Petr Sachl to Nashville for a ninth-round pick in the 2000 Entry Draft.
March 10, 2000 – Buffalo Sabres obtain Doug Gilmour, Jean-Pierre Dumont and a conditional draft pick in 2001 or 2002 from the Chicago Blackhawks for Michal Grosek.
March 6, 2000 – Colorado Avalanche obtain Ray Bourque and Dave Andreychuk from the Boston Bruins for Brian Rolston, Samuel Pahlsson, Martin Grenier and a 2000 first round draft pick (RW Martin Samuelsson).

See also
List of Stanley Cup champions
1999 NHL Entry Draft
1999 NHL Expansion Draft
50th National Hockey League All-Star Game
NHL All-Star Game
NHL All-Rookie Team
1999 in sports
2000 in sports

References
 
 
Notes

External links
Hockey Database
http://nhl.com/

 
1
1